Below are lists of films produced in Egypt in the 1930s.

List of Egyptian films of 1930
List of Egyptian films of 1931
List of Egyptian films of 1932
List of Egyptian films of 1933
List of Egyptian films of 1934
List of Egyptian films of 1935
List of Egyptian films of 1936
List of Egyptian films of 1937
List of Egyptian films of 1938
List of Egyptian films of 1939

External links
 Egyptian films at the Internet Movie Database

1930s
Egypt